Muhammad Mufli Hidayat (born 7 August 2005) is an Indonesian professional footballer who plays as a winger for Liga 1 club PSM Makassar.

Club career

PSM Makassar
He was signed for PSM Makassar to played in Liga 1 on 2022 season. Mufli made his league debut on 8 December 2022 in a match against Persita Tangerang at the Sultan Agung Stadium, Bantul.

Career statistics

Club

Notes

References

External links
 Mufli Hidayat at Soccerway
 Mufli Hidayat at Liga Indonesia

2005 births
Living people
Indonesian footballers
Liga 1 (Indonesia) players
PSM Makassar players
People from Bone Regency
Sportspeople from South Sulawesi
Association football forwards